Ivan Brunetti (born October 3, 1967) is an Italian and American cartoonist and comics scholar based in Chicago, Illinois.

Career
Noted for combining blackly humorous taboo-laden subject matter with simplified and exaggerated cartoon drawing styles, Brunetti was strongly influenced by Charles M. Schulz and Peanuts. His best known comic work is his largely autobiographical series Schizo, of which four issues appeared between 1994 and 2006, the first 3 of which have been collected as Misery Loves Comedy. Schizo #4 received the 2006 Ignatz Award for Outstanding Comic of the Year.

He has also produced two collections of gag cartoons, Haw! (2001) and Hee! (2005). He has worked as an illustrator, including cover designs for The New Yorker since 2007. His early work includes also the strip Misery Loves Comedy which he created for the University of Chicago newspaper The Maroon while a student there. The strip bears no relation to the 2007 Fantagraphics Books collection of the same name, which collects the first three issues of Schizo in their entirety, along with additional material contributed to various other publications during the same time period.

In 2005, Brunetti curated The Cartoonist's Eye, an exhibit of 75 artists' work, for the A+D Gallery of Columbia College Chicago. He then edited An Anthology of Graphic Fiction, Cartoons, and True Stories (2006, Yale University Press), which was declared a bestseller by Publishers Weekly in January 2007. The second and final volume of the anthology was released in October 2008. Brunetti also illustrated the cover of comedian Patton Oswalt's album, My Weakness Is Strong.

Brunetti's nonfiction book Cartooning: Philosophy and Practice (2011, Yale University Press) won a 2012 Eisner Award. Also in 2012, Brunetti contributed to The Guardian'''s "Cartoonists on the world we live in" series.

His second nonfiction book, Aesthetics: A Memoir, appeared in 2013 to positive reviews.

He is currently on the faculty of Columbia College Chicago, where he teaches classes on comics, drawing and design.

Bibliography

ComicsSchizo #1–4 (Fantagraphics, 1994–2006)Haw! Horrible, Horrible Cartoons by Ivan Brunetti (Fantagraphics, 2001)32 Drunks (Self-published mini-comic, 2001)Hee! Yet More Horrible Cartoons (Fantagraphics, 2005)

Collected editionsMisery Loves Comedy (Fantagraphics, 2007)Ho! (Fantagraphics, 2007)

NonfictionCartooning: Philosophy and Practice (Yale University Press, 2011)Aesthetics: A Memoir (Yale University Press, 2013)

Children's booksWordplay (TOON Books, 2017)3x4 (TOON Books, 2018)Comics: Easy As ABC (TOON Books, 2019)

Anthologies (as editor)An Anthology of Graphic Fiction, Cartoons, & True Stories (Yale University Press, 2006)An Anthology of Graphic Fiction, Cartoons, & True Stories, Volume 2 (Yale University Press, 2008)

New Yorker coversJanuary 8, 2007May 7, 2007March 2, 2009September 7, 2009January 4, 2010February 15 & 22, 2010November 1, 2010May 31, 2010March 19, 2012July 1, 2013September 23, 2013November 4, 2013April 21, 2014December 15, 2014November 2, 2015September 12, 2016

Illustrator

Cover art for Tomahawk's album Oddfellows.Cover art for Patton Oswalt's album My Weakness Is Strong.''

References

External links
The Ivan Brunetti Interview at Comic Book Galaxy
Ivan Brunetti Interview on the Yale Press Log

1967 births
Living people
American cartoonists
American comics artists
American comics writers
American writers of Italian descent
Italian emigrants to the United States
Artists from Chicago
Columbia College Chicago faculty
The New Yorker cartoonists
Underground cartoonists